Haut-Komo is a department of Woleu-Ntem Province in northern Gabon. The capital lies at Médouneu. The department borders with Equatorial Guinea. It had a population of 3,403 in 2013.

References

Woleu-Ntem Province
Departments of Gabon